Thorny Lea Golf Club is a private country club in Brockton, Massachusetts founded in 1900. The current club structure was built in 1900. It has a clubhouse with many features. This is an 18-hole golf course with a 70 par.

External links
Thorny Lea Golf Club website

1906 establishments in Massachusetts
Buildings and structures in Brockton, Massachusetts
Golf clubs and courses in Massachusetts
Sports in Brockton, Massachusetts
Sports venues completed in 1906
Tourist attractions in Plymouth County, Massachusetts